The 2002 Oklahoma state elections were held on November 5, 2002. The primary election was held on July 23. The runoff primary election was held August 27.

Overview

Executive Branch Before Election

Legislature Before Election

Executive Branch After Election

Legislature After Election

See also
Government of Oklahoma
Oklahoma House of Representatives
Oklahoma Senate
Politics of Oklahoma
Oklahoma Congressional Districts

 
Oklahoma
Oklahoma House of Representatives elections
Oklahoma Senate elections
Oklahoma